The Malappuram district has four types of administrative hierarchies: 
 Taluk and Village administration managed by the provincial government of Kerala
 Panchayath Administration managed by the local bodies
 Parliament Constituencies for the federal government of India
 Assembly Constituencies for the provincial government of Kerala

Civic administration

Being the headquarters city, Malappuram comprises the Civil Station area which consists of administrative and other Government offices of the district such as District Collectorate, District Treasury, RTO, PWD Division Office, District Panchayat, Town planning Office, Text depot, District Medical office, etc. to name a few.
The city is administered by the Malappuram Municipality, headed by a Municipal Chairman. For administrative purposes, the city is divided into 40 wards, from which the members of the municipal council are elected for five years. The Chairman of Malappuram Municipality is Sri mujeeb Kaderi (IUML) and the Deputy Chairperson is Sri. Konnola fousiya (INC). The present Malappuram District Collector is K. Gopalakrishnan.

ISO Certification
Malappuram is the first municipal body in India to win an ISO 9001-2008 certification for quality management. It has been on a track of fast reforms for the past couple of years and has achieved the distinction of having zero pendency of files.

Law and order
City police is headed by a DySP (Deputy Superindent of police) of Malappuram. And Office of Superintendent of Police is also at Malappuram. Apart from regular law and order, city police comprise the Malappuram Traffic Police, Bomb Squad, Dog Squad, Women's Cell, Narcotics Cell, Malabar Special Police, Armed Police Camp, District Crime Records Bureau.

Proposed Malappuram Municipal Corporation

There is a demand to upgrade Malappuram Municipality to a Municipal Corporation by incorporating the local bodies in the Greater Malappuram region.
The proposed Malappuram Municipal Corporation comprises:
Malappuram Municipality
Manjeri Municipality
Kottakkal Municipality
Anakkayam Outgrowth.
Trikkalangode, a suburb village of Manjeri
Koottilangadi, a suburb village of Malappuram
Pookkottur, a suburb village of Malappuram
Kodur, a suburb village of Malappuram
Ponmala, a suburb village of Malappuram
Othukkungal, an outgrowth of Malappuram
Makkaraparamba

Political Divisions
The federal, provincial and local administration of Malappuram district has a complex structure.

Legislative Assembly constituencies

Parliament constituencies

Administrative subdivisions
The district consists of two revenue divisions (Tirur and Perintalmanna), seven subdistricts, 135 villages, 15 blocks, twelve municipalities and 100 panchayats.

Revenue administration
For the ease of revenue administration, there are 7 subdistricts in the district, which are again divided into 138 villages. These 7 subdistricts are combined in 2 revenue divisions namely Tirur and Perinthalmanna.

Ponnani, Tirur, Tirurangadi, and Kondotty are included in the Tirur revenue division, whereas the remaining Taluks together form Perinthalmanna revenue division.

Rural administration

For the ease of rural administration, the rural district is divided into 94 Gram Panchayats which together form 15 blocks. These 15 block panchayats combine to form the Malappuram district Panchayat, which is the apex body of rural governance in the district. The 94 Gram Panchayats are again divided into 1,778 wards. However, Census towns (small towns with urban features) also come under the jurisdiction of Gram Panchayats.

Urban administration
For the ease of urban administration, 12 municipalities are there in the district.

See also

Education in Malappuram
History of Malappuram
List of desoms in Malappuram (1981)
List of Gram Panchayats in Malappuram
List of people from Malappuram
List of villages in Malappuram
Transportation in Malappuram
Malappuram metropolitan area
Malappuram district
South Malabar

References

External links
Loksabha constituencies 

Politics of Malappuram district
Malappuram